Holcocerus witti is a species of moth in the family Cossidae. It was described by Yakovlev, Saldaitis and Ivinskis in 2007. It is found in north-western Iran.

References

Natural History Museum Lepidoptera generic names catalog

Cossinae
Moths described in 2007
Moths of Asia